Richard Adolphus Came (23 April 1847 – 19 July 1917) was an architect who initially worked in London. He gained commissions over a wide area of south-eastern England and according to one source these included "boarding schools, private residences, country houses in Lancing, East Grinstead, Tunbridge Wells, Broadstairs, Ealing, Child's Hill, Hampstead, Winkfield and Windsor." He also designed warehouses in Cannon Street, Cheapside, Bread Street and the German Athenæum Club at 19 Stratford Place in London, as well as electric light stations in Pall Mall, St. James, Richmond and Preston. Came was also a surveyor laying out building developments and acted as a property developer, owning and selling some of the buildings. Two of his major developments were connected with horse racing. At Newmarket he developed two areas of the town and at Ascot he designed most of the residences facing the racecourse.

In 1874–76 he was the architect for the Grantham and Kesteven Hospital. Subsequent to this in 1887 he was commissioned to survey and lay-out Woodhall Spa in Lincolnshire as a new Spa Town. By about 1895 he had moved his architectural practice to Woodhall and was responsible for designing many of the half timbered Arts and Crafts style buildings in the town. He was a pupil of Matthew Digby Wyatt and trained at the Royal Academy School. He qualified as an ARIBA on 6 November 1871.

Architectural work

Hospital

Grantham and District Hospital, Manthorpe Road, Grantham 1874–76. Stone, Gothic revival with groups of pavilions.

Church
The Roman Catholic Church of Our Lady and St. Peter, Woodhall Spa, Lincolnshire  In 1895 Fr Peter Sabela from Grantham opened a Mass centre at Woodhall Spa and in the same year land off Cromwell Avenue was purchased and Thomas Young of Kingerby Hall, near Market Rasen, provided most of the funds to build a church. Came's original drawings remain in the Diocesan archives. They show that the building was intended as a "chapel or school room".

Houses 
The Golf Hotel,  Woodhall Spa.

References

Further reading
Antram N (revised), Pevsner N & Harris J, (1989), The Buildings of England: Lincolnshire, Yale University Press.
Antonia Brodie (ed), Directory of British Architects, 1834–1914: 2 Vols,  British Architectural Library, Royal Institute of British Architects, 2001 pp 324–5

1847 births
1917 deaths
19th-century English architects
Architects from Lincolnshire
People from Woodhall Spa
Associates of the Royal Institute of British Architects